Jay Faerber (born 1972) is an American comic book and television writer. Faerber is known for his work on Generation X and New Warriors for Marvel Comics, and The Titans and Connor: Spotlight for DC Comics. He later wrote his own creator-owned titles for Image Comics, including Noble Causes, Dynamo 5, Near Death and Copperhead. He was also a writer on the TV series Ringer, Star-Crossed and Zoo. Currently he writes for The CW TV series Supergirl.

Early life and influences
Faerber grew up in northeastern Pennsylvania, and spent a considerable amount of his childhood in the Seattle area. His early interest in superheroes was sparked by TV series such as Spider-Man and His Amazing Friends, the Adam West Batman series and the 1960s The Superman/Aquaman Hour of Adventure, which featured his first exposure to the Teen Titans. This led to Faerber's interest in comic books, beginning with Marv Wolfman and George Pérez's The New Teen Titans #25 in 1982, the first comic book with which he discovered that medium's more mature storylines and detailed artwork. Faerber's view of the series' ability, at the time, to stand on its own without requiring reading the related titles influenced Faerber's stated practice of keeping his own creator-owned books independent of one another, in order to avoid obligating readers of one of his titles to read the others in order to comprehend the storyline. The title also led to Faerber's interest in many other titles, such as Marvel Comics' Uncanny X-Men.

During the early part of his childhood, Faerber would buy his comics from a local pharmacy, which limited his reading to Marvel and DC Comics. For Christmas 1986, Faerber, a high school freshman, was taken by his mother to his first comic book shop, Gema Books, where he discovered books from companies other than the Big Two, such as Elementals, Miracleman and The New Wave, the latter of which impressed him with its experimental biweekly, 16-page format, its emphasis on character depth over physical combat, and the originality of the character's personalities.

As a child, Faerber would write and draw his own comics, though he assumed that writing was merely a means to provide something for him to draw. This changed by his first or second year of high school, when he discovered the TV series Spenser: For Hire, and later, the novels on which it was based by Robert B. Parker, whom Faerber names as the biggest single influence on his career as a writer.  Although he had already been a fan of other private eye shows such as Magnum, P.I. and Riptide, the humor, intelligence and pace of the first Spenser novel he read, Ceremony, had such an effect on him that he tried writing a prose mystery story starring a private eye from one of his comics, which he let his English teacher read. The teacher, Maureen Purcell, the daughter of Golden Age comics artist Howard Purcell, praised Faerber's story. Faerber continued drawing, but concentrated more on prose writing. He was accepted as an art major at a local community college, but dropped out after one semester, when an instructor told him he needed to learn how to draw in order to draw comics. Realizing that his abilities lay in writing, he switched majors.

Faerber has also cited as influences the crime novels of Andrew Vachss, Robert Crais and Lee Child, as well as the television writing and detective novels of Stephen J. Cannell, in particular his work on the TV series Wiseguy, and Chris Haddock's work on the Canadian TV series Da Vinci's Inquest.

Seminal works in the comics medium that Faerber has cited as influences include John Byrne's work on Alpha Flight, Mark Waid's work on Captain America, Fabian Nicieza's runs on The New Warriors and Psi-Force, Mike Grell's work on Jon Sable, Freelance, Bob Harras' work on The Avengers, and Robert Kirkman's work on the comic book Invincible.

Career
Faerber first broke into the comic book industry in 1998, when Marvel Comics purchased a story he wrote for the series What If...?. The book had already been cancelled, so the editor had no compunction about hiring him to write the final issue.

Faerber's first ongoing series writing assignment was Generation X, which he began with issue #45 (December 1998). Assignments on The New Warriors and The Titans would follow.

In 2002, Faerber began publishing through Image Comics the series Noble Causes, which follows the lives of the Nobles, a wealthy superhero family, and which emphasized their interpersonal conflicts over battles with supervillain enemies. The series lasted until 2008, and concluded with issue #40.

In 2007, Faerber debuted the Noble Causes spinoff, Dynamo 5, which starred a group of five illegitimate of the assassinated superhero Captain Dynamo, who were assembled by Dynamo's widow in order to protect Tower City. Like Noble Causes, Dynamo 5 was also a monthly series by Image Comics that depicted the superhero family dynamics, but placed more emphasis on action, dividing its content between the team's battles with adversaries and its interpersonal conflicts. Dynamo 5 ended its ongoing run with issue #25 (Oct. 2009), and continued with a series of miniseries and one-shots.

In 2008, Faerber published a miniseries called Gemini, which stars Dan Johnson, an ordinary man who is unaware that at night, he comes under the control of an organization called the Constellation, who transform ordinary people like him into crimefighters named after star constellations, without any of these people retaining any knowledge or memory of these events. Although intended as a five-issue miniseries, the last issue published was issue #4 (July 2009), which featured a guest appearance by Dynamo 5.

In September 2011, Faerber debuted Near Death, a crime series whose lead character, Markham, is an assassin who sets out to atone for his past sins after capturing a glimpse of hell during a near-death experience. During the course of the book, which mostly consists of self-contained stories, Markham saves people's lives (some of whom are targeted by other hitmen working for his former clients), not because his near-death experience made him a more altruistic person, but solely because of his self-interested motive in avoiding hell, a point with which Faerber hopes to explore questions of moral character and the nature of heroism. In creating the series, Faerber was inspired by the work of Andrew Vachss, Robert B. Parker, Robert Crais and Lee Child, and 80s crime shows such as The Equalizer and Stingray. In particular, the lack of any known first name for Markham is inspired by Vachss' Burke series and Parker's Spenser. It is Faerber's first series that does not feature any science fiction or fantasy elements, as it is a straight-crime drama.

Faerber was a writer on the CW TV series Ringer, which starred Sarah Michelle Gellar, and ran from September 2011 to May 2012. Faerber then worked on the staff of the CW TV series Star-Crossed, which lasted one season, from 2013 - 2014.

In 2014 Faerber premiered Copperhead, a science fiction Western series set on a planet of the same name. The series, which is drawn by  Scott Godlewski, is inspired by the idea,"What if Deadwood had aliens?" He also joined the writing staff of the CBS TV series Zoo, which began airing in 2015. The first episode Faerber wrote was the series' fifth episode, "Blame It On Leo" and he remained with the show for its entire three year run. In 2019 Faerber joined the writing staff of Supergirl.

Writing habits and approach 

Faerber gets up between 6:00 and 6:30am, tries to be at the desk in his home office/study writing by 9am. He says that he spends much time at the desk thinking about the stories he writes, even though days may go by with nothing to show for it. When attempting to conceive of the premise of a new series, he will sometimes play video games on his PlayStation 3 in order to let his mind "wander", and will keep a notepad handy in order to jot down ideas as they come to him. He takes a half-hour lunch in the early afternoon, and then continues working until 4pm. He describes himself as a "morning person", saying, "I know I'm pretty useless past 6 or 7pm". As of September 2014, he works on a  MacBook Air, running OS X Mavericks.

Faerber writes his comic book scripts in Mozilla's Open Office software, and I  write his television scripts in Final Draft, though he does not use the latter's automatic formatting or templates, as he prefers to perform those tasks manually, explaining that he is a fast typist. Although he likes the idea of using applications in his writing, and has Evernote on his iPhone, iPad and laptop, he does not use it, preferring to write down ideas on his phone's Notes application. He uses GoodReader on his iPad, and the Adonit Jot Pro stylus to write notes on scripts written by himself or others. He prefers to work in silence rather than listen to music, but will wear Bose noise-cancelling headphones to listen to instrumental film or television soundtracks that "fit" with what he is writing if the noise from the school across the street from his home becomes too distracting.

Personal life
Faerber lived in the Gig Harbor, Washington area, before moving with his wife to Burbank, California shortly before September 2014.

Filmography
Ringer
1.08 - Maybe We Can Get a Dog Instead (writer) (2011)
1.16 - You're Way Too Pretty to Go to Jail (writer with Cathryn Humphris) (2012)
1.19 - Let's Kill Bridget! (writer with Bob Berens) (2012)
Avengers Assemble
1.09 - Depth Charge (writer with Man of Action) (2013)
1.14 - Hulk's Day Out (writer with Man of Action) (2013)
Star-Crossed
1.07 - To Seek A Foe (writer) (2014)
1.11 - Give me a Torch (writer with Marc Halsey) (2014)
Zoo
1.05 - Blame It on Leo (writer) (2015)
1.08 - The Cheese Stands Alone (writer with Scott Rosenberg) (2015)
1.10 - Emotional Contagion (writer) (2015)
2.03 - Collision Point (writer with Rebekah F. Smith) (2016)
2.06 - Sex, Lies & Jellyfish (writer with Matt Pitts) (2016)
2.10 - Yellow Brick Road (writer with Matt Pitts) (2016)
3.03 - Ten Years Gone (writer with Shintaro Shimosawa) (2017)
3.07 - Wham, Bam, Thank You Sam (writer with Shintaro Shimosawa) (2017)
3.10 - Once Upon a Time in the Next (writer with Shintaro Shimosawa) (2017)
Supergirl
5.04 - In Plain Sight (writer with Jess Kardos) (2019)
5.09 - Crisis on Infinite Earths: Part One (teleplay with Derek Simon, story by Robert Rovner & Marc Guggenheim) (2019)
5.15 - Reality Bites (writer with Dana Horgan) (2020)
6.01 - Rebirth (teleplay with Jess Kardos, story by Robert Rovner & Jessica Queller) (2021)
6.08 - Welcome Back, Kara (writer with Dana Horgan) (2021)
6.13 - The Gauntlet (teleplay with Brooke Pohl, story by Dana Horgan) (2021)
6.19 - The Last Gauntlet (teleplay with Derek Simon, story by J. Holtham) (2021)

Bibliography

DC Comics
Secret Origins 80 Page Giant (Wonder Girl story only) (1998)
Young Justice 80 Page Giant #1 (10 page Impulse story) (1999)
Secret Files & Origins Guide to the DC Universe (3 page backup) (2000)
Young Justice: Sins of Youth Secret Files #1 (Main story) (2000)
Young Justice #22 (5 page Red Tornado Story) (2000)
Titans Secret Files #1-2 (1999; 5 page backup story)
Titans Secret Files #2 (2000; main story and profiles)
Superman 80 Page Giant #3 (2000)
Superman Adventures #48 (2000)
Green Lantern Circle of Fire: Green Lantern/Firestorm #1 (2000)
The Titans #13, #17-20 (Co-written with Devin Grayson) (2000)
Superboy #80-82 (2000–2001)
The Batman Chronicles #23 (Jason Bard Story only) (2001)
The Titans #21 - 41 (2000–2002)
Adventures of Superman #577 (Dialog only), #607 (2000, 2002)
Green Lantern #126-128, 157 (2000, 2003)
DC Universe Holiday Special '09 (Batman story only) (2009)

DC Comics/Wildstorm
Gen-Active #1-6 (2000–2001)
Robotech #0-6 (2003)
Robotech: Love and War #1-6 (2003–2004)
Robotech: Invasion #1-5 (2004)

Digital Webbing
Digital Webbing Presents #25 (Firebirds story only) (2005)

Harris Comics
Vampirella #15-18 (2002–2003)
Vampirella Halloween: Trick & Treat ("Lust" story only) (2004)

Harris Comics/Anarchy Studios
Xin: Legend of the Monkey King #1-3 (2002–2003)
Xin: Journey of the Monkey King #1-3 (2003)
Vampi Vs Xin #1-2 (2004–2005)

IDW
Angel Spotlight On Conner #1 (2006)

Image Comics
Noble Causes: First Impressions #1 (2001)
Noble Causes #1-4 (2002)
Noble Causes: Family Secrets #1-4  (2002–2003)
Noble Causes: Distant Relatives #1-4 (2003)
Venture #1-4 (2003)
Dodge's Bullets (2004)
Firebirds (2004)
The Pact #2 (2005)
Four Letter World ("Loud" story only) (2005)
Image Holiday Special (2005)
Dynamo 5 Annual #1 (2008)
Gemini #1-4 (2008–2009)
Noble Causes Vol. 2 #1-40 (2004–2009)
Dynamo 5 #1-25 (2007–2009)
Dynamo 5: Sins of the Father #1-5 (2010)
Near Death #1-11 (Sept 2011–July 2012)
Point of Impact #1-4 (October 2012 - January 2013)
Copperhead #1-19 (2014–2018)
Graveyard Shift #1-4 (2014-2015)
Secret Identities #1-7 (co-written with Brian Joines) (2015)
Elsewhere #1-8 (2017-2018)
Over My Dead Body Graphic Novel (2020)

Image Comics/Top Cow Productions
Strykeforce #1-5 (2004)
Pilot Season: "Urban Myths" (2008)
Witchblade Annual (2009)

Marvel Comics
What If...? #114 (1998)
X-Force #84 (Dialog only) (1998)
Mutant X Annual 1999 (1999)
Generation X Annual 1999 (1999)
Captain America #23 (Dialog only) (1999)
Uncanny X-men #374 (Dialog only) (1999)
Generation X #45, #48-62 (1998–2000)
New Warriors Vol. 2 #0-10 (1999–2000)
X-Men The Movie: Wolverine (2000)
Iron Fist/Wolverine #1 - 4 (2000–2001)
X-Men: Evolution #9 (2002)
Amazing Fantasy Vol. 2 #13 - 14 (Captain Universe backups only) (2005)
Captain Universe/Hulk #1 (2006)
Captain Universe/Daredevil #1 (2006)
Captain Universe/X-23 #1 (2006)
Captain Universe/The Invisible Woman #1 (2006)
Captain Universe/Silver Surfer #1 (2006)
Doc Samson Vol. 2 #3 (2006)
The Halo Graphic Novel ("Armor Testing" story) (2006)
War of Kings: Warriors #2 (2009)

MonkeyBrain Comics
Anti-Hero #1-10 (2013-2014)

Moonstone Comics
Moonstone Noir: The Hat Squad (2002)

References

External links

Dynamo 5

Scripts & Scribes Interview with Jay Faerber

American comics writers
American graphic novelists
Living people
1972 births
Date of birth missing (living people)
Place of birth missing (living people)
Novelists from Pennsylvania
American male novelists
People from Gig Harbor, Washington